Hemicrepidius falli is a species of click beetle belonging to the family Elateridae.

References

falli
Beetles described in 1908